Pinzano al Tagliamento is a comune (municipality) in the Province of Pordenone in the Italian region Friuli-Venezia Giulia, located about  northwest of Trieste and about  northeast of Pordenone.

Pinzano al Tagliamento borders the following municipalities: Castelnovo del Friuli, Clauzetto, Forgaria nel Friuli, Ragogna, San Daniele del Friuli, Sequals, Spilimbergo, Travesio, Vito d'Asio.

References

Cities and towns in Friuli-Venezia Giulia